When the Kellys Were Out is an Australian feature-length film directed by Harry Southwell about Ned Kelly. Only part of the film survives today.

Plot
Constable Fitzpatrick arrives at the Kelly house, to accuse Dan Kelly of cattle duffing. He is met by Kate Kelly, Dan's sister, and is taken by her beauty. Mrs Kelly tries to prevent the arrest and Ned arrives. A quarrel ensues in which Fitzpatrick is attacked, and Ned flees. He joins with Steve Hary, Joe Byrne and Dan Kelly and escapes to a hide out.

Ned hears that his mother has been arrested and forms a hatred for the police. He and his gang hold up Younghusband Station and just escape the police. Then there are the Wombat murders, from which only one person survives. The gang hold up the bank at Jerilderie and Kate Kelly rides to warn her brothers. Ned and his gang then kill Aaron Sheritt and there is a siege at the battle of Glenrowen Hotel in which Ned is captured and the rest of his band killed.

Cast

 Godfrey Cass as Ned Kelly
 Rose Rooney as Kate Kelly
 Harry Southwell as Aaron Sherritt
 Charles Villiers as Dan Kelly
 William Ellison as Steve Hart
 Allan Douglas as Joe Byrne
 Fred Twitcham as Constable McIntyre
 Syd Everett as Sergeant Steele
 Mervyn Barrington as Sergeant Kennedy
 W Ryan as Fitzpatrick
 Don McAlpine as Scanlan
 D Sweeney as Lonergan
 Rita Aslin as Mrs Kelly
 Dunstan Webb as Superintendent Nicolson
 Beatrice Hamilton as Mrs Byrne
 David Edelsten as the judge

Production
The film was shot in Sydney and on location in the Burragong Valley. Shooting was completed by late 1922.

Reception
The movie was banned in October 1922 by New South Wales censors but was released in Melbourne the following year. It proved popular with audiences, despite historical errors and poor reviews.

In late 1923 it was still banned in New South Wales. There was an attempt to overturn the ban in 1925, but it was rejected.

The film was released in England in a shortened version, entitled The True Story of the Kelly Gang. Pat Hanna called it the best movie ever made in Australia.

References

External links
 
 When the Kellys Were Out at National Film and Sound Archive

1923 films
1923 Western (genre) films
Australian black-and-white films
Bushranger films
Cultural depictions of Ned Kelly
Silent Australian Western (genre) films
Films directed by Harry Southwell
1920s English-language films